Purwanchal Campus (Nepali: पूर्वाञ्चल क्याम्पस), also known as Eastern Regional Campus is a constituent engineering campus of the Institute of Engineering (IOE) in Dharan, Nepal.

Introduction

Purwanchal Campus, formerly known as Eastern Region (ERC) Campus is one of constituent campuses of Tribhuwan University (TU) and one of the associate engineering campuses of Institute of Engineering (IOE) which is a comprehensive, non-profit making, autonomous institution and pioneering institution of higher education level in Nepal funded by government of Nepal. It has an average acceptance rate of 2.24 as it accepts only 336 students from 15000+ students.
It is situated at Gangalal Marg, Tinkune, Dharan-8, Sunsari district in the eastern region of Nepal. It occupies an area of 443 ropani (34-13-11.75 Bigahas) in convenient unit, which is equivalent to about 0.23 square kilometers roughly 22.54 hectares. It is adjacent to Charkose Jhadi (densely forest) in north and located at entrance gate by bus of Dharan Sub-metropolitan city.

It was established in Poush of 2034 BS (1976) under the loan agreement with Asian Development Bank (ADB) with name purwanchal technical school under Nepal government. In another agreement with government of United Kingdom (UK) held in Shrawn, 2035 BS (1978), the technical assistance was provided by the government of United Kingdom (UK). ERC was formally organized under Institute of Engineering (IOE), Tribhuvan University (TU) and all the construction works were completed in 2043 BS (1984).

Infrastructure

The area having 34-13-11.75 bighas (225.4 square kilometers) of land in which different classrooms, laboratories, workshops and other physical facilities are available at IOE/Purwanchal Campus, Dharan. This area is fully protected by boundary wall and the sole property of Tribhuvan University. Almost 1/3 of land is still unused and the campus has planned on running more advanced engineering programs so that the whole land is fully utilized in the future. The existing building and facilities here are:

 Administrative building
 General classroom
 Special classroom
 Laboratories and workshops of different departments (Science & humanities but now called Applied Science, Agricultural, Architecture, Electrical, Mechanical, Civil, Electronics and Communication Engineering)
 Library
 Boys' and girls' hostel buildings
 Canteen
 Campus chief residence
 Teachers' and staff's residence
 Guard room
 Internet facility of 22 MBPS (176 Mbit/s)
 Drinking water facility
 Seminar hall
 Playground with football, basketball, volleyball, cricket, table tennis and badminton courts

New construction

The agricultural engineering department is further extended with new building having 3 classrooms, toilet (girls' & boys') and the same as up to plinth level. Also the girls' hostel building is upgraded to two floors which was previously a single ground floor. It is also in planning to construct and renovate energy building for architecture department in two floor level.

The school offers seven bachelor's degree programs, in Agriculture Engineering, Civil engineering, Electronics, Communication and Information engineering, Mechanical engineering, Computer engineering, Electrical engineering and Architecture. The campus is an owned and funded by the Government of Nepal. Potential students must pass an IOE entrance exam before applying for admission. Quotas aid disadvantaged groups. After 2015 the total number of students admitted in this college is 384.

Reach the campus

By bus: 12 hour from Kathmandu; 1 hour from Biratnagar; 1/2 hour from Itahari; 3 hours from Bagdogara, Silliguri, India; 1.30 hour from Jogbani, India

By air: 45 minutes from Kathmandu to Biratnagar

History 
Being an eastern wing of IOE, the campus is also famed by the name of Eastern Regional Campus (ERC).

This was established in 1978 A.D. Initially, this campus offered diploma courses.

The campus firstly started trade level courses in Mechanical, Electrical and Civil engineering streams as specified in the loan and the project agreements. The  programs in Diploma in Mechanical, Electrical, Civil Engineering (3 years) was started since 2043 BS (1984) and also Refrigeration & Air-conditioning Engineering program in 2052 BS, Computer and electronics engineering program in 2059 BS. In the attempt to further up gradation, IOE/ Purwanchal Campus introduced Bachelor level course that was Bachelor of Engineering (BE) in Agricultural Engineering in 2057 BS (2000) which was first and pioneer in the country. Another BE program in Civil Engineering was commenced from 2061 BS (2004).

The campus was also conducted under Council for Technical Education & Vocational Training (CTEVT) since 2045/11/12 (BS) by the mandate of Government of Nepal and later again came back and run under IOE/ TU since 2047/2/15 BS.

Accommodation And Intake

Undergraduate programs 

The programs running in the campus are:

 Agricultural Engineering
 Architecture
 Computer Engineering
 Civil Engineering
 Electrical Engineering
 Electronics, Communication & Information Engineering
 Mechanical Engineering

Research activities

There is mandatory project work for final year students. Students and faculties are conducting very useful research activities:

Department of agricultural engineering students has conducted soil less agriculture experiments: hydroponics and aero phonics. The department in coordination with Purwanchal Campus and Center for Applied Research and Development (CARD) has organized Summer School in Kathmandu in June, 2017. Three professors from Washington State University, USA, have presented their research activities among agricultural and other department students.

Department of Electronics and Computer Engineering are working to develop smart advance hardware and software tools. Robotics club in the campus is coordinating with industries to develop useful robot.
Each department has separate RTCU (research training consultancy unit) and does their activities under the RTCU.

Bachelor in Computer Engineering (BCT)
This course started from 2013 AD with 48 seats per year. This department is increased from 48 seats to 96 seats from 2018. Er. Manoj Kumar Guragain is the HOD of this department (2077 B.S).

Bachelor of Civil Engineering (BCE) (144 seats) 
This is the largest department by number of student since 2015 after the addition of 48 seats to the previous seats of 48. After 2015 the number of students admitted in this faculty is 96. The Civil Engineering is a four-year, eight semester program. Adequate labs have been provided to test civil engineering projects. But labs are rarely conducted citing technical problems.  The HOD of Civil engineering department is Er. Prabhat Pratap Dev. The campus is planning to increase the number of seats to 144 students although it lacks laboratory instruments and other resource

Bachelor of Agricultural Engineering (BAG) (48 seats) 
It is the oldest faculty of this college in undergraduate programmers. This is the only campus that provides academic program of Agricultural Engineering in Nepal. The product of Agricultural Engineers is only 48 in number. Agricultural Engineering is the engineering discipline that studies agricultural production and processing. Agricultural engineering combines the disciplines of mechanical, civil, electrical and chemical engineering principles according to technological principles. A key goal of this discipline is to improve the efficiency and sustainability of agricultural practices. Agricultural engineers may perform tasks such as planning, supervising and managing the building of dairy effluent schemes, irrigation, drainage, flood water control systems, performing environmental impact assessments, design of agricultural machinery, equipment, & agricultural structures, agricultural product processing and interpret research results and implement relevant practices. The HOD of this department is Er.Yam Kumar Rai.

Bachelor of Electrical Engineering (BEL) 
This course was started in 2071 B.S. Electrical Engineering is a four-year, eight semester program. Electrical engineers design and develop electrical machines.
The Head of Department is Pankaj Rouniyar.

Bachelor in Mechanical Engineering (BME) 
This course was started in 2069 B.S.after the phase out of diploma in mechanical engineering in purwanchal campus in the year 2069 B.S.when the Tribhuvan university was decided to remove all certificates level program/courses from the university. The program mainly focus on the design,Productions and manufacturing of mechanical components/products.The HOD Of the mechanical department is Asst. professor Ram Dayal Yadav.

Bachelor in Architecture (B.Arch) (48 seats) 
Architecture is the blend of art and Science in designing physical structures that shape the environment in which we live, using creativity and practical understanding of structures and materials do develop concept, plans, and specifications and detailed drawing of buildings. Architects may also be involved in project feasibility studies, heritage study, urban planning, interior design and landscape design. The HOD of this department is Sanjaya Babu Maharjan.

Bachelor in Electronics and Communication (BEX) (48 seats) 
This course was started from 2069 BS to 2074 BS with 48 seats per year. Students couldn't intake in this course as the course was Revised integrating aspects of Information engineering in 2018 AD(2075 BS) and named Bachelor in Electronics, Communication and Information Engineering (BEI)

Bachelor in Electronics, Communication and Information Engineering (BEI) (48 seats) 
This course was started from 2075 BS with 48 seats per year. It is the currently Revised syllabus of Bachelor in Electronics and communication engineering.
Er. Manoj Kumar Guragain is the HOD of this department.

Masters in Land and Water Resources Engineering 
This is the stream in MSc in ERC. The number of students in this stream is 20.. The pre-required qualifications is BE in Agricultural/Civil Engineering. 
This Program Runs under the department of Civil and agricultural Engineering.This MSC program is started in the year 2018A.D..
The Coordinator of this program is Asst.Prof.Er. Aditya Dhakal

Masters in Information System Engineering 
This courses is under the department of electronic and computer engineering Of ERC. 
The number of students in this stream is (5 In regular +15 in fullfee scheme). The program coordinator of this program is Bishu chaudhary(Asst. Professor in the department of electronic and computer engineering).The Pre-required qualification for this program is BE in electronic/computer engineering. This Program is started in the year 2021A.D.
The Coordinator of this program is Asst.Prof.Er. Bishnu Choudhary

MSC in Sanitation Engineering 
This course is started in the year 2021A.D..This Program runs under the department of civil and agricultural Engineering. The Program coordinator of this program is Er.Kajiram karki.
the pre-required qualifications for this program is BE in civil, agricultural, geomatics engineering, or 4 year bsc in chemistry or public health. 
The Coordinator of this program is Asst.Prof.Er. Kajiram karki

Future plans 
The campus has planned to:

Conduct master program in different engineering streams
Double student intake capacity
Sign MOU with other institutions, research centers and organizations
Establish of research center
Conduct teachers training
Organize annually conference, seminar and workshop
Publish ERC Journal biannually
Recruit visiting faculties
Introduce software based applications for Exam section/ Library/ Store/and other educational activities
Build virtual class room to conduct distance lecture
Have access international journals
since the students face lot of problems staying outside the campus perimeter so adequate hostel for all students is in great demand for the campus
Upgrading the physical infrastructures, laboratories, seminar hall

Student Club,Technical and Political Societies

 Nepal Agricultural Engineering Student's Society(NAESS)
 Society of Mechanical Engineering Students (SOMES)
 Electrical Engineering Students Society (ELESS)
 Association of Computer Engineering Students (ACES)
 Electronic and Communication Engineering Students Society (EXCESS)
 Civil Engineering Students Society (CESS)
 DELTA
 Associations of Architecture Students
 Robotics Club, IOE Purwanchal Campus
 Purwanchal Dance Club (PDC)
 ERC Musician 
 Engineering Literature Society
 The engineer's Talk 
 Erc Girls' Society
 NTBNS(नेपाल तराई विद्यार्थी नवजागरण संध) 
 BPR(bara parsa Rauthant engineering students society)
 Far-west engineering students society (FWESS)
Jhapa Morang sunsari engineering students society (JMSESS)
 International Association Of Agriculture and related Science Students(IAAS),Local Congress, Purwanchal campus, Dharan
 Spiritual Association for Vedic      Education (SAVE),IOE Purwanchal Campus, Dharan.
Veri Karnali Enginering Samaja.
Research-Hub,IOE Purwanchal   campus
E-bidhyarthi 
Newa bidhyarthi dabu
Lumbini bidhyarthi samaj
Nepal Student Union (NSU) 
All Nepal National free student Union(ANNFSU)

Graduate and professional course 

 Purwanchal Campus Dharan in collaboration with Kathmandu University(KU) and Global Sanitation Graduate School(GSGS)/IHE Delft is conducting 4 months long online mode professional learning course in sanitation technology(PLCS) for graduate and professional with relevance to science and technology.
 Course Developed by
IHE Delft
Institute for water education Netherlands
Global Sanitation Graduate School
GSGS Project at KU(Kathmandu University)
No. of seat available=20
50% seat are reserved for female candidates.

 Contact info:-
Administrative Block Purwanchal Campus,Gangalalmarg Dharan-08, 
Sunsari,Province no:-01,Nepal
website:-sanitation.ioepc.edu.np

Laboratories 
The campus has the following laboratories, six in engineering and two in science, as well as a language lab:

 Civil Engineering
 Engineering Materials testing Lab
 Soil testing Lab
 Hydraulics Lab
 Structural Lab(cement,
 reinforcement, brick and concrete testing)
 Water supply Lab
 Transportation Lab
 Electrical Engineering
 Electric Power Lab
 Electrical Machines Lab
 Automatic & Digital Control Lab
 Power Electronics Lab
 Electrical instrumentation &
 Measurement Lab
 Micro Hydro Lab
 Basic Electrical Engineering Lab
 Electronics and Computer Engineering
 Digital Electronics Lab
 Communication Lab
 Computer Lab(Basic Computer lab, Advanced Computer lab, Computer Repair & Maintenance lab, Internet lab, Multimedia lab)
 Basic Electronics Lab
 Mechanical Engineering
 Thermal and Refrigeration Engineering Lab
 Mechanical Hydraulics Laboratory
 Engineering Science and Humanities Department
 Engineering Chemistry Lab
 Engineering Physics Lab
 Communication Lab
Workshops

 Agricultural Engineering
 SoilScience Laboratory
 FarmPower and Enginesystem lab
 Farm Machinery and tractor lab

Workshops 
There are 11 workshops on the campus.
 Civil department
 Carpentry workshop
 Plastering workshop
 Plumbing workshop
 Electrical department
 Electrical Installation
 Basic Electrical and Repair & Maintenance workshops.
 Mechanical department
 Machining workshop
 Fitting & Maintenance workshop
 Arc Welding and Foundry/Forgin Workshop
 Welding & Sheet Metal workshop
Automobile workshop
 Electronics
 Electronic Repair and Maintenance workshop

See also 
 Tribhuvan University
 Kathmandu University
 Pokhara University
 Mid-western University
 Kathmandu University

External links
 Institute of Engineering
 Pulchowk Campus, IOE
 Thapathali Campus, IOE
 Pashchimanchal Campus, IOE

References 

Tribhuvan University
Engineering universities and colleges in Nepal
1978 establishments in Nepal